The Matabeleland football team is the team representing Matabeleland, the western part of Zimbabwe. They are not affiliated with FIFA or CAF, and therefore cannot compete for the FIFA World Cup or the Africa Cup of Nations. The team is affiliated to the Confederation of Independent Football Associations (ConIFA).

Matabeleland Football Confederacy

The Team is run by Matabeleland Football Confederacy which was founded in 2016. The Matabeleland Football Confederacy is administered by the Save Matabeleland Coalition. Matabeleland Football Confederacy is an independent football association promoting football in Matabeleland. The Confederacy is open to all clubs and soccer associations in Matabeleland provided they subscribe to the Constitution of MFC. Its objectives being development through sport, Soccer for human rights Community Development. Career grooming and exposure. International Representation. The Confederacy was founded in 2016 by Busani Sibindi who is its President. The Technical Director who is also a Co-founder is Busani Khanye.

History

The team were originally scheduled to play their first official friendly against Darfur on 10 December 2017, however travel problems led to the game being cancelled. Nevertheless, because of results in unofficial games against club sides, Matabeleland still gathered enough points to qualify for the 2018 ConIFA World Football Cup in London.

In 2022, Matabeleland entered the CONIFA African Cup, drawing 1-1 to Yoruba Nation and beating eventual winners Biafra FC 1-0. They lost the final game 1-0 to Biafra to get 2nd place in the competition.

Conifa World Football Cup Participation

Matabeleland have played in the 2018 ConIFA World Football Cup qualification. Matabeleland participated in its maiden major Tournament, the CONIFA World Football Cup to be held in London from 31 May to 10 June 2018. As part of the promotion for the tournament, sponsors Paddy Power launched a competition to design the kit Matabeleland will wear during the competition. With English coach Justin Walley at the helm, it was previously announced that former Liverpool great Bruce Grobbelaar would work as goalkeeping coach while Halifax Town and current Zimbabwe international Cliff Moyo would appear for the side. However, when the final squad was announced, Moyo did not appear.

At the tournament, Matabeleland experienced a testing first game, losing 6–1 to Padania, while Thabiso Ndlela scored their first competitive goal. A final game victory over Tuvalu delivered a record 3–1 win with Shylock Ndlovu scoring a brace, pitting them against Algerian region Kabylia in the first placement round. Despite a strong performance, the Matabeleland side fell 4–3 on penalties. However, boosted by the appearance of Zimbabwean legend Bruce Grobbelaar, two 1–0 victories followed against Chagos Islands (replacing the expelled Ellan Vannin) and Tamil Eelam as the African team eventually finished 13th in the overall tournament rankings.

At the end of the tournament, English coach Justin Walley stepped down as manager, while the MFC announced the formation of a women's team and participation in the 2018 Human Rights Cup.

Conifa African Cup Participation

Matabeleland competed in 2022 CONIFA African Cup. They drew their first game against Yoruba Nation, drawing 1-1. They beat Biafra FF 1-0 to qualify for the final, where they played Biafra FF again. They lost 1-0 and finished 2nd in CONIFA African Cup

International record

At CONIFA World Football Cup

CONIFA African Cup
2nd - 2022

Current squad
The following players were called up to the 2018 ConIFA World Football Cup. Caps and goals correct as of 30 May 2018.

Note: While ConIFA accepts unofficial games as caps, Matabeleland's first officially recognised game was 31 May 2018 against .

References 

CONIFA member associations
African national and official selection-teams not affiliated to FIFA
Matabeleland Land national football team